The Sony Xperia Z is a 2013 Android smartphone. It was announced by Sony at CES 2013 and was released on 9 February 2013 in Japan and 1 March 2013 in Singapore and the UK. The Xperia Z was initially shipped with the Android 4.1.2 (Jelly Bean) operating system. The smartphone has Ingress Protection Ratings of IP55 and IP57, making it dust protected, low-pressure water jet protected, and waterproof, which allows for immersion under 1 meter of water for up to 30 minutes. It also contains a 13.1 MP Exmor RS camera sensor as well as a TFT 1920x1080 display with 441 PPI.

Alongside the Xperia Z, Sony unveiled a variant called the Sony Xperia ZL, which uses the same hardware as the Xperia Z, but sacrifices water resistance for a smaller frame, a physical camera button and an infrared blaster.

In June 2013, Sony unveiled a phablet version of the Xperia Z called the Sony Xperia Z Ultra.

Its successor, the Sony Xperia Z1, was released on 20 September 2013.

Design
The Xperia Z is a rectangular slab that marks a departure from Sony's 2012 design. The design is "Omni-Balance", which is focused on creating balance and symmetry in all directions, according to Sony. The Xperia Z has subtly rounded edges and reflective surfaces on all sides, which are held together by a skeleton frame made from glass fiber polyamide. The aluminum power button is placed on the right-hand side of the device, which is said to make one-handed operation easier.

Hardware

Dimensions, design and battery 
The phone's dimensions are stated to be 139 x 71 x 7.9 mm and its weight is 146 grams (including the battery). It comes with a non-user-replaceable lithium-ion battery, rated at 2330 mAh.

The phone is covered on the front and back by tempered glass, where the front is Dragontrail Glass from Asahi Glass Company resin-bonded to the LCD, and the back is Corning Gorilla Glass.

Camera 
It includes a 13.1-megapixel rear camera with an Exmor RS IMX135 image sensor, flash, image stabilization, HDR, face detection (with red-eye reduction), Sweep Panorama, scene recognition and 16x digital zoom, and a 2.2-megapixel front camera with a Sony Exmor R sensor. Both cameras record video at 1080p.

The rear camera is one of the first mobile phone cameras with HDR video.

The camera software is equipped with a quick launch feature, also known as fast capture, allowing the optional automatic capture of a photo or record video immediately after launched from the lock screen.

The burst shot mode of the Xperia Z has three speed settings of high speed (0.9 megapixels), middle (9.6 megapixels) and low (2.1 megapixels). For unknown reasons, the resolution at the lowest speed setting is lower than the medium speed setting. At the highest speed setting, the device is able to capture 1000 photos within 68 seconds.

Tests suggest that poor image processing in the automatic (standard) camera mode leads to a quality loss that photos captured through burst mode appear at a higher quality in comparison.

Display 
The smartphone has a capacitive touchscreen with a size of 5", and its resolution is 1920x1080 pixels (1080p) at 441 ppi, with 16 million colors. The screen uses Sony's Mobile BRAVIA Engine 2 for picture enhancement.

Chipsets and storage 
In addition to this, the smartphone has a Qualcomm Snapdragon S4 Pro chipset, 2 GB RAM, 16 GB internal storage flash memory (with approx. 11 GB available to the user) and a microSD card slot which accepts cards up to 128 GB.

Interfaces and connectivity 
The smartphone has a built-in 3.5 mm audio jack for headphones, GPS and GLONASS support, Bluetooth 4.0, Wi-Fi, HDMI (via MHL), MirrorLink 1.0, Miracast and NFC, in addition to being DLNA certified. In Japan, the smartphone features an infrared blaster.

NFC is a core feature of the device. The device is certified to IP55 and IP57 standards to be dust protected, low pressure water jet protected and waterproof, allowing immersion under 1 meter of water for up to 30 minutes.

Software

The Xperia Z originally ran Android 4.1.2 Jelly Bean with Sony's launcher and additional applications, including Sony's media applications (Walkman, Album and Movies), as well as a battery stamina mode. The device received an update on 24 June 2013, to Android 4.2.2 Jelly Bean. In December 2013, the Android 4.3 Jelly Bean software update rolled out for Xperia Z devices. In May 2014, the Android 4.4.2 KitKat software update rolled out, later followed by Android 4.4.4 in September 2014.

On 16 October 2014, Sony reported that it would be updating the entire Xperia Z lineup of devices, to Android 5.0 Lollipop, beginning in early 2015, for the core Xperia Z3 and Xperia Z2 devices, with others following soon after. Later in CES 2015 at Sony's event, they announced that Android 5.0 Lollipop would be rolled out to the Xperia Z series starting February 2015.

On 29 May 2015, Sony released Android 5.0 Lollipop for the Xperia Z, followed by Android 5.0.2 from 23 May 2015. On 7 September 2015, Sony released Android 5.1 Lollipop for the Xperia Z. This was the final firmware update for the device, as Android 6.0 Marshmallow was released for the Xperia Z2 and later Xperia devices only.

Network compatibility

The following table shows which UMTS and LTE bands are supported. See the list of UMTS networks and the list LTE networks to find which bands are required to use a cell phone service provider.

All variants support four 2G GSM bands 850/900/1800/1900.

Reception and sales
The Xperia Z has received mostly positive reviews from critics. Damien McFerren of CNET gave the phone 4 and a half stars out of five and said "The Sony Xperia Z combines looks, power and connectivity to supply one of the most impressive Android experiences we've seen in quite some time. The lack of Android 4.2 at launch is unfortunate and that 5-inch screen isn't going to suit everyone, but there's little room for complaint elsewhere. This is easily Sony's best phone yet, and one of the best Android phones ever released".

Android Central gave the phone a positive review, saying "For Android fans, the Sony Xperia Z was one of the highlights of a fairly quiet CES. A 5-inch, 1080p phone with a bold new design language and fancy new camera technology, the Xperia Z was probably the most compelling phone of the show. And just a couple of months later, it's now available to buy in the UK. Without a doubt, Sony Mobile's new baby is one of the largest, with full specs Android phones around".

Audience reactions to the phone have also been positive. At CES 2013, the Xperia Z won the ‘Best Smartphone' and ‘Best of Show' awards. According to a Sony executive, Mcdougall, early Xperia Z sales have been strong. He states, "It [the Xperia smartphone] sold over 150,000 units in its first week in Japan, taking a 24 percent market share straight away." "It may be a bit too early to say but the first signs are very positive."

See also
 Xperia Z series
 LTE (telecommunication) (3GPP Long Term Evolution)
 LTE Advanced (next version of LTE)
 List of LTE networks
 UMTS frequency bands
 E-UTRA

References

External links

Android (operating system) devices
Mobile phones introduced in 2013
Digital audio players
Discontinued flagship smartphones
Sony smartphones